May 18th National Cemetery (Hangul: 국립5·18민주묘지; Hanja: 國立5·18民主墓地) is a cemetery for those who participated in the Gwangju Uprising. Built by the government of South Korea in 1997, it is located in Gwangju. Every May, on the anniversary of the uprising, it is common for citizens to visit the cemetery to honor the dead.

History
The Gwangju Uprising, also known as May 18 Democratic Uprising, was a democratic movement in South Korea directed against the Chun Doo-hwan government, which violently suppressed Gwangju citizens. Under the Kim Young-sam administration, there was a movement to make May 18th National Cemetery a democratic shrine.

The previous May 18th Cemetery, or the "Mangweol-dong Cemetery" (구묘역), was the former burial site of those who died during the May 18th Democratic Uprising and the proceeding democratic movement. Some of those interred there for 17 years were delivered to the cemetery in garbage trucks. Due to the cemetery's reputation as a Mangweol-dong, a "holy ground for democracy", the military had plans to destroy the graveyard. Those plans never came to fruition.

Following the democratization of Korea, a plan to create a National Cemetery was announced in 1993, giving rise to the New National Cemetery for the May 18th Democratic Uprising. Construction began in November 1994 and the new cemetery was opened in May 1997. Bodies from the Mangweol-dong Cemetery were exhumed and re-interred in the new location, while the old cemetery was restored to its former state. The new cemetery was promoted to the status of a national cemetery by presidential decree by Kim Dae-jung on July 27, 2002, and renamed the National Cemetery for the May 18th Democratic Uprising on January 30, 2006. An annual commemoration is held each May, in which people pay their respect to those who died at both the old and new cemeteries.

Taryn Assaf observed that The two cemeteries came to represent two different aspects of the uprising: the new, designed to represent a commemoration of past sacrifices and the old marked by the symbolism of a continuing struggle. Interesting to note is the suggestion evident in the process of naming. Equating 'new' with 'official' and 'old' with 'unofficial' serve to influence popular conception of the significance of the different actors involved in the uprising, their place in history, their ideologies and their legacies.

Burials

 Burial capacity: 784
 Number of burial sites: 482

Notable burials
Old Cemetery (구묘역, 舊墓域)
 ; Born in Jangseong County, educated at Chosun University. He died during the Gwangju Uprising, although the exact circumstances of his death are not known.
 Lee Han-yeol; Born in Hwasun County, Jeonlanamdo in 1966. Democratic movement activist. Fatally wounded during June 10th Democracy Movement demonstration in front of Yonsei University, his death sparked further protests.
 ; Student activist who died in 1991 during the demonstration against military dictatorship.
 ; Student leader and activist from the Chonnam University.

New cemetery (신묘역, 新墓域)

Monuments and memorials

May 18th Memorial Monument
This monument represents the concepts of new life, survival, and seeds of hope. Near the center point of the pillars is an ovular sculpture, representing "resurrection". To the right and left of the monument are two bronze sculptures called "Grassroots Resistance of May".

Memorial Hall
The Memorial Hall allows visitors to view and interactively experience the events of the May 18th Democratic Uprising. The exhibition includes a historical record of the Uprising, tributes to victims, a virtual tour of important landmarks in the democratic movement, and facilities for educational presentations.

Portrait Enshrinement Tower
This building is designed in the form of a dolmen, a traditional tomb dating to the prehistoric period. Portraits of those who are buried in the May 18th National Cemetery are enshrined on the walls of this building.

Seungmoru
A two-story exhibition space with facilities for viewing video footage of the Gwangju Uprising.

Hill of Democracy
A memorial hill planted with "Trees of Democracy" representing "the will of all Korean people to commemorate the noble sacrifice" of Uprising participants.

Gates
Several memorial gates stand on the grounds. At the entrance is the Gate of Democracy, which contains a visitor guestbook. The Gate Cherishing the Memory of the Deceased stands approximately three stories high. The Gateway to History contains historic photographs and video documentaries.

Art
Numerous statues honor Uprising victims and express hope for peace and justice, including the Bronze Statue of Armed Resistance and the Statue of a Peaceful and Prosperous World. A series of relief sculptures titled "Seven Scenes From History" depicts the history of resistance to oppression in Korea.

See also
 History of Korea
 April Revolution
 June Democratic Uprising

References

Further reading
 

Gwangju Uprising
Cemeteries in South Korea
Buildings and structures in Gwangju
National cemeteries
Monuments and memorials in South Korea
1997 establishments in South Korea